Cara Seymour (born 6 January 1964) is a British actress from Essex, England. She has appeared in films such as You've Got Mail, American Psycho, Adaptation, Dancer in the Dark, Gangs of New York, Hotel Rwanda, The Savages, and An Education. She appeared on stage in the New York Shakespeare Festival production of Caryl Churchill's The Skriker.

Filmography

Film

Television

References

External links 
 

1964 births
Living people
English film actresses
English stage actresses
English television actresses
Actresses from Essex
20th-century English actresses
21st-century English actresses